The Concrete's Always Grayer on the Other Side of the Street is the first EP released by VietNam in 2004 on Vice Records. Features 5 songs recorded in 2003.

Track listing 

 "Too Tired"
 "Makes No Difference"
 "Princess"
 "ApocLAypse"
 "Lullabye"

External links 
Record Label's site
 [ AllMusic review and rating]

2004 debut EPs
VietNam (band) albums
2004 live albums
Live EPs